The Federal Office for the Environment is the Swiss environmental agency, a division of the Federal Department of Environment, Transport, Energy and Communications. It is responsible for matters of the environment, including the protection of plants and animals and the protection against noise, air pollution or natural hazards.

History 
The Federal Office for Environmental Protection was founded in 1971. In 1989, it was merged with the Federal Office for Forests and Landscape Protection to form the Swiss Agency for the Environment, Forests and Landscape. In 2006, it was fused with the Federal Office for Water and Geology and renamed Federal Office for the Environment.

Directors 
 Katrin Schneeberger (from September 2020)
 Christine Hofmann (Director a.i. from February to August 2020)
 Marc Chardonnens (2016–2020)
 Bruno Oberle (2005–2015)
 Philippe Roch (1992–2005)
 Bruno Böhlen (1985–1992)
 Rodolfo Pedroli (1975–1985)
 Friedrich Baldinger (1971–1975)

See also 
 Environmental movement in Switzerland
 Federal Ethics Committee on Non-Human Biotechnology
 Nature parks in Switzerland
 Waste management in Switzerland
 Biodiversity Monitoring Switzerland

References

External links 

 Official website
 

Environment
Environment of Switzerland
Environmental policies organizations
Environmental protection agencies
Environmental agencies
Environmental organisations based in Switzerland
Federal Department of Environment, Transport, Energy and Communications